John Regis Head Monahan (November 15, 1908 – April 23, 1979) was a professional football player in the NFL.

College career
A native of Pittsburgh's Greenfield neighborhood, Monahan traveled to Ohio State where he played for the Buckeyes. He was a guard and tackle who doubled as a kicker. In 1934 he became captain of the Buckeyes and an All-American. He was featured on the front of the 1935 Wheaties box.

Professional career
Monahan played four seasons with the Detroit Lions from 1935 until 1938. He was part of the 1935 Lions team that won the NFL championship. Monahan played two additional games with the Chicago Cardinals during the 1939 NFL season.

References

External links
Monahan at Football Reference
Monahan at Database Football

1908 births
American football placekickers
American football guards
American football tackles
Players of American football from Pennsylvania
Ohio State Buckeyes football players
Sportspeople from Pennsylvania
Chicago Cardinals players
1979 deaths